Elliot Aidan Cowan (born 9 July 1976) is an English actor, known for portraying Corporal Jem Poynton in Ultimate Force, Mr Darcy in Lost in Austen, and Ptolemy in the 2004 film Alexander. He also starred as Lorenzo de' Medici in Da Vinci's Demons and Daron-Vex in Krypton. Cowan most recently is known for playing King Henry VII in part 1 of the STARZ series The Spanish Princess.

Early life and education
Born in London, Cowan was brought up in Colchester, Essex. He is the son of a consultant physician and a charity worker, and has a younger brother and sister.

Cowan boarded at Uppingham School in Rutland. He later obtained a first class degree in drama at the University of Birmingham, before attending the Royal Academy of Dramatic Art in London, from which he graduated in July 2001. From 1994 to 1996, Cowan was a member of the National Youth Music Theatre. He plays guitar and cello, and has worked with the London Sinfonia.

Career
Cowan's television credits include Judge John Deed, Ultimate Force, Jonathan Creek, Poirot,  Foyle's War, The Ruby in the Smoke, Lost in Austen and the television movie The Project.

Cowan has appeared in the films The Golden Compass, Happy-Go-Lucky, The Christmas Miracle of Jonathan Toomey, Love and Other Disasters, and Howl. His theatre work includes productions of The Revenger's Tragedy, Women Beware Women, Henry V, The Seagull and Camille.

He played Stanley Kowalski in the 2009 revival of A Streetcar Named Desire at the Donmar Warehouse, and was a lead in Les Blancs at the National Theatre in 2016.

He played Macbeth at the Globe Theatre from 23 April- 27 June 2010 alongside Laura Rogers as Lady Macbeth.

He starred as Lord Goring in An Ideal Husband at the Vaudeville Theatre in London's West End from 4 November 2010 to 19 February 2011.

As of 2010, he voiced Alec Trevelyan in Goldeneye 007 for the Wii console, also providing his likeness.

Personal life
He lives in Dalston, London.

Filmography

Television

Film

Videogame

Theatre

References

External links

Official ITV 'Lost in Austen' website
Swim for Alfie 
Zurich for Alfie
2011 Lake Zurich Swim – Guy's and St. Thomas's Neonatal – Alfie Blacksell 

1976 births
English male television actors
English male stage actors
English male film actors
English male voice actors
English male radio actors
Alumni of the University of Birmingham
Alumni of RADA
People educated at Uppingham School
English male Shakespearean actors
Living people
Royal Shakespeare Company members
21st-century English male actors
People from Dalston